Tipula is a very large insect genus in the fly family Tipulidae (crane flies). The members of this genus are sometimes collectively called common crane flies. Tipula contains over 2,000 species located throughout the world.

Like all crane flies, Tipula species have long bodies and long legs, somewhat resembling large mosquitos. Adults generally have a body length of 15-20 mm. They are usually brown with clear or brownish wings. They feed on nectar and are active throughout the year. Tipula maggots are sometimes known as "leather jackets" due to their tough skin.

Technical description: Discal cell present ; M3 arises from M4 ; all tibiae spurred  Antennae with whorls of long hairs. Rs usually long ; Sc ends far from base of Rs ; cell 4 always petiolate ; body colour usually grey, brown or dull yellow, rarely black ; praescutal stripes
(when present) usually dull, rarely slightly shining

Species of Tipula can be affected by fungal diseases, such as Zoophthora porteri, found in Tennessee, USA.

Species
See list of Tipula species.

References

External links
Catalogue of the Craneflies of the World

Tipulidae
Tipuloidea genera
Taxa named by Carl Linnaeus